Tobacco control is a field of international public health science, policy and practice dedicated to addressing tobacco use and thereby reducing the morbidity and mortality it causes. Since most cigarettes and cigars and hookahs contain/use tobacco, tobacco control also concerns these. E-cigarettes do not contain tobacco itself, but (often) do contain nicotine. Tobacco control is a priority area for the World Health Organization (WHO), through the Framework Convention on Tobacco Control. References to a tobacco control movement may have either positive or negative connotations, depending upon the commentator.

Tobacco control aims to reduce the prevalence of tobacco use and this is measured with the "age-standardized prevalence of current tobacco use among persons aged 15 years and older".

Connotations
The tobacco control field comprises the activity of disparate health, policy and legal research and reform advocacy bodies across the world. These took time to coalesce into a sufficiently organised coalition to advance such measures as the World Health Organization Framework Convention on Tobacco Control, and the first article of the first edition of the Tobacco Control journal suggested that developing as a diffusely organised movement was indeed necessary in order to bring about effective action to address the health effects of tobacco use.

The tobacco control movement has also been referred to as an anti-smoking movement by some who disagree with its aims, as documented in internal tobacco industry memoranda.

Early history of tobacco control 
The first attempts to respond to the health consequences to tobacco use followed soon after the introduction of tobacco to Europe. Pope Urban VII's thirteen-day papal reign included the world's first known tobacco use restrictions in 1590 when he threatened to excommunicate anyone who "took tobacco in the porchway of or inside a church, whether it be by chewing it, smoking it with a pipe or sniffing it in powdered form through the nose". In this restriction, tobacco was sentenced to excommunication, not so much because it harmed health, but because its use within the Churches was intolerable because it ruined the atmosphere of the masses. Thus, these sentences would not be made against tobacco per se (whose individual consumption was not penalized as long as it was moderate), but rather for its improper use in places considered sacred and public. The condemnation of improper use remains intact in Catholic doctrine today.

The earliest citywide European smoking restrictions were enacted in Bavaria, Kursachsen, and certain parts of Austria in the late 17th century.

In Britain, the still-new habit of smoking met royal opposition in 1604, when King James I wrote A Counterblaste to Tobacco, describing smoking as: "A custome loathsome to the eye, hateful to the nose, harmeful to the brain, dangerous to the lungs, and in the black stinking fume thereof, nearest resembling the horrible Stigian smoke of the pit that is bottomeless."  His commentary was accompanied by a doctor of the same period, writing under the pseudonym "Philaretes", who as well as explaining tobacco's harmful effects under the system of the four humours ascribed an infernal motive to its introduction, explaining his dislike of tobacco as grounded upon eight 'principal reasons and arguments' (in their original spelling):

Later in the seventeenth century, Sir Francis Bacon identified the addictive consequences of tobacco use, observing that it "is growing greatly and conquers men with a certain secret pleasure, so that those who have once become accustomed thereto can later hardly be restrained therefrom".

Smoking was forbidden in Berlin in 1723, in Königsberg in 1742, and in Stettin in 1744. These restrictions were repealed in the revolutions of 1848. In 1930s Germany, scientific research for the first time revealed a connection between lung cancer and smoking, so the use of cigarettes and smoking was strongly discouraged by a heavy government sponsored anti-smoking campaign.

Origins of modern tobacco control
After the Second World War, the German research was effectively silenced due to perceived associations with Nazism.  However, the work of Richard Doll in the UK, who conclusively identified the causal link between smoking and lung cancer in 1952, brought this topic back to attention. Partial controls and regulatory measures eventually followed in much of the developed world, including partial advertising bans, minimum age of sale requirements, and basic health warnings on tobacco packaging.  However, smoking prevalence and associated ill health continued to rise in the developed world in the first three decades following Richard Doll's discovery, with governments sometimes reluctant to curtail a habit seen as popular as a result - and increasingly organised disinformation efforts by the tobacco industry and their proxies (covered in more detail below).  Realisation dawned gradually that the health effects of smoking and tobacco use were susceptible only to a multi-pronged policy response which combined positive health messages with medical assistance to cease tobacco use and effective marketing restrictions, as initially indicated in a 1962 overview by the British Royal College of Physicians and the 1964 report of the U.S. Surgeon General.

In the United States, the 1964 report of the Advisory Committee to the Surgeon General represented a landmark document that included an objective synthesis of the evidence of the health consequences of smoking according to causal criteria. The report concluded that cigarette smoking was a cause of lung cancer in men and sufficient in scope that “remedial action” was warranted at the societal level. The Surgeon General report process is an enduring example of evidence-based public health in practice.

Comprehensive tobacco control

At the global level 
The concept of multi-pronged and therefore 'comprehensive' tobacco control arose through academic advances (e.g. the dedicated Tobacco Control journal), not-for-profit advocacy groups such as Action on Smoking and Health and government policy initiatives. Progress was initially notable at a state or national level, particularly the pioneering smoke-free public places legislation introduced in New York City in 2002 and the Republic of Ireland in 2004, and the UK efforts to encapsulate the crucial elements of tobacco control activity in the 2004 'six-strand approach' (to deliver upon the joined-up approach set out in the white paper 'Smoking Kills'  ) and its local equivalent, the 'seven hexagons of tobacco control'. This broadly organised set of health research and policy development bodies then formed the Framework Convention Alliance to negotiate and support the first international public health treaty, the World Health Organization Framework Convention on Tobacco Control, or FCTC for short.

The FCTC compels signatories to advance activity on the full range of tobacco control fronts, including limiting interactions between legislators and the tobacco industry, imposing taxes upon tobacco products and carrying out demand reduction, protecting people from exposure to second-hand smoke in indoor workplaces and public places through smoking bans, regulating and disclosing the contents and emissions of tobacco products, posting highly visible health warnings upon tobacco packaging, removing deceptive labelling (e.g. 'light' or 'mild'), improving public awareness of the consequences of smoking, prohibiting all tobacco advertising, provision of cessation programmes, effective counter-measures to smuggling of tobacco products, restriction of sales to minors and relevant research and information-sharing among the signatories.

WHO subsequently produced an internationally-applicable and now widely recognised summary of the essential elements of tobacco control strategy, publicised as the mnemonic MPOWER tobacco control strategy.  The six components are:

 Monitor tobacco use and prevention policies
 Protect people from tobacco smoke
 Offer help to quit tobacco use
 Warn about the dangers of tobacco
 Enforce bans on tobacco advertising, promotion and sponsorship
 Raise taxes on tobacco
One of the targets of the Sustainable Development Goal 3 of the United Nations (to be achieved by 2030) is to "Strengthen the implementation of the World Health Organization Framework Convention on Tobacco Control in all countries, as appropriate." The indicator that is used to measure progress is the "age-standardized prevalence of current tobacco use among persons aged 15 years and older".

In 2003, India passed the Cigarettes and Other Tobacco Products (Prohibition of Advertisement and Regulation of Trade and Commerce, Production, Supply and Distribution) Act, 2003 restricted advertisement of tobacco products, banning smoking in public places and other regulation on trade of tobacco products. In 2010, Bhutan, passed the Tobacco Control Act of Bhutan 2010  to regulate tobacco and tobacco products, banning the cultivation, harvesting, production, and sale of tobacco and tobacco products in Bhutan.

Tobacco control policies

Age restriction 
Tobacco policies that limit the sale of cigarettes to minors and restrict smoking in public places are important strategies to deter youth from accessing and consuming cigarettes. Amongst youth in the United States, for example, when compared with students living in states with strict regulations, young adolescents living in states with no or minimal restrictions, particularly high school students, were more likely to be daily smokers. These effects were reduced when logistic regressions were adjusted for sociodemographic characteristics and cigarette price, suggesting that higher cigarette prices may discourage youth to access and consume cigarettes independent of other tobacco control measures.

In December 2022, New Zealand became the first country to pass a bill that effectively raises the minimum age for cigarette consumption annually, in an effort to prohibit their sale to future generations. The bill specifically prohibits the sale of cigarettes to anyone born on or after 1 January 2009.

Graphic warning labels 
Smokers are not fully informed about the risks of smoking. Tobacco packaging warning messages which are graphic, larger, and more comprehensive in content are more effective in communicating the health risks of smoking. Smokers who noticed the warnings were significantly more likely to endorse health risks, including lung cancer and heart disease. In each instance where labelling policies differed between countries, smokers living in countries with government mandated warnings reported greater health knowledge.

Graphic warning labels on cigarette packs are noticed by the majority of adolescents, increase adolescents’ cognitive processing of these messages and have the potential to lower smoking intentions. The introduction of graphic warning labels has greatly reduced smoking among adolescents.

Smoke-free public places 

Smoking in indoor workplaces was first prohibited nationwide by the Republic of Ireland in 2003, with most other leading economies following suit with similar ordinances in subsequent years.

Smoking cessation 
Smoking cessation services borrow from the methodologies of other addiction recovery interventions to assist smokers to quit. As well as reducing morbidity and mortality for individual patients, these have been repeatedly found to reduce the overall cost to health systems of treating smoking-related disease.

Reception and further international collaboration
Now an accepted element of the public health arena, tobacco control policies and activity are seen to have been effective in those administrations which have implemented them in a co-ordinated fashion.

The tobacco control community is internationally organised - as is its main opponent, the tobacco industry (sometimes referred to as 'Big Tobacco').  This allows for sharing of effective practice (both in advocacy and policy) between developed and developing states, for instance through the World Conference on Tobacco or Health held every three years.  However, some significant gaps remain, particularly the failure of the US and Switzerland (both bases for international tobacco companies and, in the former case, a tobacco producer) to ratify the FCTC.

Journal
Tobacco Control is also the name of a journal published by BMJ Group (the publisher of the British Medical Journal) which studies the nature and implications of tobacco use and the effect of tobacco use upon health, the economy, the environment and society.  Edited by Ruth Malone, Professor and Chair, Department of Social & Behavioral Sciences, University of California, San Francisco, it was first published in 1992.

Opposition
Direct and indirect opposition from the tobacco industry continue, for instance through the tobacco industry's efforts at misinformation via suborned scientists  and 'astroturf' counter-advocacy operations such as FOREST.

See also 

 Action on Smoking and Health
 Anti-Cigarette League of America
 Anti-tobacco movement in Nazi Germany
 List of smoking bans
 List of cigarette smoke carcinogens
 National Non-Smoking Week   
 Patrick Reynolds, an anti-smoking activist
 Philip Morris v. Uruguay
 Plain tobacco packaging
 Smoking age   
 Smoking ban
 Smoking bans in private vehicles
 Terrie Hall (1960 – 2013), anti-smoking activist who died from smoking
 Tobacco advertising
 Tobacco packaging warning messages
 Tobacco politics
 Tobacco-Free College Campuses
 Tobacco-Free Pharmacies
 Vaping
 WHO Framework Convention on Tobacco Control   
 Word of Wisdom
 World No Tobacco Day

Notes and references

Bibliography

External links
Tobacco Control journal
Tobacco Policy

 
Health movements